The women's javelin throw event at the 1970 Summer Universiade was held at the Stadio Comunale in Turin with the final on 5 September 1970.

Records

Results

References

Athletics at the 1970 Summer Universiade
1970